Yershovsky (masculine), Yershovskaya (feminine), or Yershovskoye (neuter) may refer to:
Yershovsky District, a district of Saratov Oblast, Russia
Yershovsky (inhabited locality) (Yershovskaya, Yershovskoye), several rural localities in Russia